Murzynowo  is a village in the administrative district of Gmina Skwierzyna, within Międzyrzecz County, Lubusz Voivodeship, in western Poland.

The village has a population of 1,000.

References

Villages in Międzyrzecz County